The 2019 Women's Herald Sun Tour sponsored by Lexus of Blackburn was a women's cycle stage race held in Victoria, Australia, from 30 to 31 January 2019. The 2019 edition was the second edition of the race and centred around Phillip Island and Churchill. The race was won by Lucy Kennedy.

Route

Classification leadership table

References

2019 in women's road cycling